KRI Imam Bonjol (383) is a Parchim-class corvette currently operated by the Indonesian Navy. Prior to 1994, the Imam Bonjol was part of the East German Volksmarine, as the Teterow (234).

Specifications 
Imam Bonjol, being a Parchim-class corvette, has a displacement of 865 tonnes as standard and up to 935 tonnes when fully loaded. Her propulsion of 3 fixed pitch propellers powered by 3 diesel generators, one 500 kW and two 200 kW.

Service history 
The ship was initially part of the East German Volksmarine, developed as small anti-submarine ships. The Teterow (234) was built by Peene-Werft and was laid on 1 July 1981, launched the following year on 27 March 1982 and commissioned on 27 January 1984.

Following the end of the Cold War and the reunification of Germany, Teterow was formally decommissioned by Volksmarine on 2 October 1990 and integrated with the unified German Navy on 3 October. Teterow was assigned hull number P 6168 during its brief service in the German Navy and later was laid up in 1991. The ship was sold to the Indonesian Navy, alongside 15 other Parchim-class corvettes and 23 other vessels in a US$12.7 million deal. She was renamed Imam Bonjol and was commissioned on 26 April 1994, following modifications.

The Imam Bonjol was assigned to patrol waters around the Strait of Malacca in early 2016. She was part of the Indonesian Navy's Western Fleet (Koarmabar), participating in anti-piracy operations and EEZ patrols.

On 17 June 2016, Imam Bonjol received aerial reconnaissance reports of foreign fishing ships in Indonesian waters around the Natuna Archipelago, and proceeded to pursue the vessels. She fired warning shots, which according to the Chinese Ministry of Foreign Affairs injured a fisherman. One of the vessels, the Han Tan Cou (19038) was captured with her crew of 7 Chinese nationals. Chinese Coast Guard vessels shadowed the Imam Bonjol as she escorted Han Tan Cou to the Indonesian naval base at Ranai, though no fighting occurred.

President of Indonesia Joko Widodo held a limited cabinet meeting on board the Imam Bonjol shortly after the incident.

References

External links 

 Conway's All the World's Fighting Ships 1947–1995
 Page from FAS

Ships built in East Germany
Parchim-class corvettes of the Indonesian Navy
Ships built in Wolgast
1982 ships